Franz von Hartig (1789-1865) was an Austrian statesman.

Biography
He held a number of important government posts until the appearance of his book Genesis der Revolution in Oesterreich (“Origins of the Revolution in Austria,” 3rd edition, 1851), describing the beginning of the liberal movement in Austria, forced him into retirement. In 1860 he was elected to the Reichsrat, where he played a prominent part as a member of the Liberal Centralist Party. In 1861 he was called to the Austrian House of Lords, of which he remained a member until his death.

See also
 List of honorary citizens of Vienna
 List of Knights of the Golden Fleece

Notes

References
 

1789 births
1865 deaths
Austrian politicians
Knights of the Golden Fleece of Austria